Todd Meagher is an American entrepreneur and songwriter.

Career
Throughout the 1980s Meagher's company Todd Meagher Music had a co-publishing songwriter deal with Warner/Chappell Music co-writing songs with artists including Night Ranger, Gorky Park, Tuff (band), Eddie Money, Alice Cooper, White Lion, Warrant, Julian Lennon and Vince Neil (Mötley Crüe).

In, 2009, Meagher launched theRevolution a full-service, artist-focused, music services company with John Lennon's son Julian Lennon and Michael Birch.

In 2010, Meagher again partnered with Lennon and Birch to relaunch MyStore, an e-commerce website originally developed in 2005 to provide artists with a free web store to sell their music and merchandise via a MyStore button on their MySpace page. Also in 2010, Meagher and his company sued The Agency Group, seeking $20 million in damages. The case was settled in 2017.

In 2019, Meagher sold MyStore.Com to Mike Lindell owner of MyPillow who re-launched the site as a "Patriotic Rival to Amazon".

Affiliations
Meagher is a voting member of the National Academy of Recording Arts and Sciences, which organizes the Grammy Awards, as well as being affiliated with the Warner Chappell Music and Broadcast Music, Inc. as a writer and music publisher.

References

External links
 

1961 births
Living people